Samuel Henderson (November 27, 1764November 17, 1841) was a member of the U.S. House of Representatives from Pennsylvania.

Biography
Samuel Henderson was born and attended school in England.  He immigrated to the United States in 1782 and settled in Montgomery, Pennsylvania.  He owned and operated the Henderson Marble Quarries in Montgomery County, Pennsylvania.

Henderson was elected as a Federalist to the Thirteenth Congress to fill the vacancy caused by the resignation of Jonathan Roberts.  He died on his estate at Upper Merion, in 1841.  Interment in the family burying ground in Montgomery County, Pennsylvania.

Sources

The Political Graveyard

1764 births
1841 deaths
English emigrants to the United States
Federalist Party members of the United States House of Representatives from Pennsylvania
Politicians from Philadelphia